The Ste. Genevieve Art Colony was an art collective in Ste. Genevieve, Missouri. It was founded in 1932 by Aimee Schweig, Bernard E. Peters, and Jessie Beard Rickly. The Ste. Genevieve Summer School of Art was established in 1934. The colony was modeled on its most recent predecessor, the Provincetown Art Colony in Provincetown, Massachusetts, as well as The Shinnecock Hills Summer School of Art on Long Island, New York, the New Hope School in Pennsylvania, and the Taos art colony in New Mexico. The location of Ste. Genevieve contained rural vistas and genre scenes yet was close to the metropolitan Saint Louis area.

The group expanded to include other Saint Louis artists including Frank Nuderscher, Joe Jones, and Thomas Hart Benton. The colony attracted many Midwestern artists with the styles of painting including American regionalism, Social realism, plein air and the new Abstract art.

The colony dissolved in 1941.

Associated artists

Artists closely associated with the colony include:

Thomas Hart Benton
Sister Cassiana Marie
Frederick Conway
Joe Jones
Martyl Schweig Langsdorf
Joseph Meert  
Miriam McKinnie
Bernard E. Peters
 Jessie Beard Rickly
Aimee Schweig
E. Oscar Thalinger
Joseph Vorst
Matthew E. Ziegler

Legacy
In 2004 a study of the colony entitled An American art colony : the art and artists of Ste. Genevieve, Missouri, 1930-1940 was published. In 2011 the Museum of Art and Archaeology in Columbia, Missouri held a retrospective exhibition entitled A Midwestern View: The Artists of the Ste. Genevieve Art Colony.

References

External links
Living St. Louis:Genevieve Art video overview by Nine PBS St. Louis
Docent Guide for A Midwestern View: The Artists of the Ste. Genevieve Art Colony

American art
Artist colonies
1932 establishments in Missouri
1941 disestablishments in Missouri